Rašo Babić  (Serbian Cyrillic: Рашо Бабић, born July 7, 1977) is a Serbian former footballer.

He had played with Serbian clubs FK Polet Ratina, FK Magnohrom, FK Trayal Kruševac, FK Železničar Lajkovac, FK Mladost Lučani, FK Srem, FK Budućnost Banatski Dvor, FK Banat Zrenjanin, FK Sloga Kraljevo, Azerbaijani club FK Olimpik Baku and Kazakh FC Atyrau and FC Megasport.

References

External links
 Profile at Srbijafudbal
 Profile at Playerhistory
 Profile and stats until 2003 at Dekisa.Tripod

Living people
Sportspeople from Kraljevo
1977 births
Association football defenders
Serbian footballers
Serbian expatriate footballers
FK Mladost Lučani players
FK Srem players
FK Budućnost Banatski Dvor players
Serbian expatriate sportspeople in Kazakhstan
FK Banat Zrenjanin players
FK Sloga Kraljevo players
Serbian SuperLiga players
AZAL PFK players
Expatriate footballers in Azerbaijan
Expatriate footballers in Kazakhstan
Serbian expatriate sportspeople in Azerbaijan
FC Megasport players